Kiseljak is a town and municipality located in Central Bosnia Canton of the Federation of Bosnia and Herzegovina, an entity of Bosnia and Herzegovina. It lies in the valley of the Fojnica River, the Lepenica and the Kreševka River, which are a tributary of the Bosna, and it is on the intersection of roads from Visoko, Fojnica, Kreševo and Rakovica.

Settlements

Demographics

1971
18,335 total
Croats - 10,389 (56.66%)
Bosniaks - 6,822 (37.20%)
Serbs - 924 (5.03%)
Yugoslavs - 55 (0.29%)
Others - 145 (0.82%)

1991
In 1991 the population of the Kiseljak municipality (164 km2) was 24,426, of which 51.61% were Croats, 40.92% Bosniaks, 3.11% Serbs, 2.48% Yugoslavs and 1.88% others. The town itself had a population of 6,598, of which 60% Croats, 29% Bosniaks, 3% Serbs, 5% Yugoslavs and 4% others.

2013 Census

Sports
The town is home to the football club NK Kiseljak.

Notable people
 Branko Pleša, actor

International relations

Twin towns – Sister cities
Kiseljak is twinned  with:

  Kaštela, Croatia
  Kópháza, Hungary
  Zaprešić, Croatia

References

External links 

 

Populated places in Kiseljak
Cities and towns in the Federation of Bosnia and Herzegovina